Saltern Creek is a former rural locality in the Barcaldine Region, Queensland, Australia.

On 22 November 2019 the Queensland Government decided to amalgamate the localities in the Barcaldine Region, resulting in five expanded localities based on the larger towns: Alpha, Aramac, Barcaldine, Jericho and Muttaburra. Saltern Creek was incorporated into Barcaldine.

Geography 
The watercourse Saltern Creek (after which the locality is presumably named) flows through the locality from south-east (Ingberry) to south-west (Tara Station).

The principal land use is grazing on native vegetation.

History 

Education 
There are no schools in Saltern Creek. The nearest primary and secondary schools are in Barcaldine.

References 

Barcaldine Region
Unbounded localities in Queensland